The Very Best of Kiss is a compilation album by the American rock band Kiss. It was released on August 27, 2002. It contains 21 of the band's most popular tracks, all previously released, with original versions.

Track listing

Personnel
 Kiss
 Paul Stanley – vocals, rhythm guitar, intro guitar solo (5), first guitar solo on (10, 13), bass (15, 17)
 Gene Simmons – vocals, bass; rhythm guitar (14)
 Peter Criss – drums, vocals
 Ace Frehley – lead guitar; rhythm guitar and bass (16), vocals
 Eric Carr – drums and backing vocals (18–20), backing vocals (21)
 Vinnie Vincent – lead guitar (18–19)
 Bruce Kulick – lead guitar (20–21), bass and acoustic guitar solo (20)
 Eric Singer – drums (21)

 Additional personnel
 Not credited, but do appear

 Anton Fig – drums (16–17)
 Dick Wagner –  acoustic guitar (9)
 Vini Poncia – keyboards and backing vocals (17)
 Eddie Kramer – keyboards (13–15)
 Phil Ashley – keyboards (20)

Charts

Weekly charts

Year-end charts

Certifications

References

Kiss (band) compilation albums
2002 greatest hits albums
Mercury Records compilation albums
Island Records compilation albums
Universal Music Group compilation albums